The Honda Africa Twin  is a dual-sport motorcycle made by Honda in four versions, 1988 to 1989 as the  V-twin XRV650, then from 1990  to 2000 as the  V-twin XRV750T, then from 2016 to 2019 as the  parallel-twin CRF1000L and from 2020 to present as the CRF1100L.

XRV750

The Africa Twin, also known as the Honda XRV750, is a 742 cc dual-sport motorcycle manufactured by Honda. The motorcycle was based on the NXR-750 which won the Paris-Dakar rally four times in the late eighties.

It was preceded by the eponymous XRV650 Africa Twin which was a lighter, higher specification version made in 1988 and 1989 by Honda Racing Corporation with a 650 cc engine producing 42 kW (56 hp). The much earlier Honda XLV750R was a shaft driven motorcycle.

CRF1000L/CRF1100L

The Honda CRF1000L is a 1000 cc dual-sport motorcycle made by Honda. It became available in the UK in late 2015 and early 2016 in the US, reviving their Africa Twin line. The motorcycle is being developed as a modern interpretation of its predecessors, the XRV 750 and XRV 650, based on the NXR-750 which won the Paris-Dakar rally four times in the late 1980s. The original V-twin, Africa Twin was first sold in Europe from 1988 to the final production year of 2003 but was never brought to the United States. The CRF1000L has also been seen as a response by Honda to the heavier on road focused adventure touring motorcycles such as the BMW R1200GS, Ducati Multistrada, and Triumph Tiger Explorer with a lighter more off road focused machine.

References

External links 

Honda Africa Twin (XRV650) at the Honda Collection Hall Japan

XRV750 Africa Twin
Dual-sport motorcycles